Felicity Ann Urquhart (born 4 May 1976) is an Australian country and western music singer-songwriter, and a TV and radio presenter. Her single "Big Black Cloud", co-written with Randy Scruggs, reached No. 1 on Country Tracks National Top 30 Singles Chart in 2007. She has won numerous awards including a Centenary Medal in 2001 "For service to Australian society through country music". Urquhart married musician and producer Glen Hannah in March 2009. She has been the host of country music show Saturday Night Country on Australian Broadcasting Corporation Local Radio since March 2010.

Since 2015, Urquhart has been part of the group Bennett Bowtell Urquhart

Early life
Felicity Ann Urquhart was born on 4 May 1976 to Rex, an upholsterer, and Patricia "Trish" Urquhart. She grew up in Tamworth in rural New South Wales. Her maternal grandfather, Ernie Walmsley, was a jockey turned horse-trainer and with her grandmother, Anne, ran a pub in Bingara. Urquhart began busking in Peel Street, Tamworth during the Tamworth Country Music Festival at the age of 11. Aside from learning guitar, Urquhart had piano lessons and performed in musicals.

Career 
In 1992 Urquhart released her debut self-titled album, Felicity Urquhart on Tamworth-based Hadley Records. Her second album, Follow Me appeared in 1995 on Radio Friendly Music. Nothing to Hide was released in 1999 on EMI with New Shadow issued in 2001. On 1 January she was awarded a Centenary Medal by Prime Minister, John Howard.

Urquhart performed with western swing group Feral Swing Katz at the Gympie National Country Music Muster in August – the performance was broadcast a year later on Live on Stage by ABC Radio National with Vince Jones presenting. In 2002, she travelled to Nashville to record tracks for a future album with Hannah providing acoustic guitar, harmony vocals and song writing. Album plans fell through and Urquhart left EMI. She recorded a six-track extended play, Turn out the Light on Shock Records which was released in 2004.

Shock Records distributed My Life in 2006, which was produced by Hannah (ex-Kasey Chambers touring band). Her single "Big Black Cloud", co-written with Randy Scruggs, appeared in November and reached No.1 on Country Tracks National Top 30 Singles Chart on 24 January 2007. On 5 September, Urquhart performed for John Howard, United States President George W Bush and Australian Defence Force personnel at a barbecue on Garden Island.

Urquhart released Landing Lights upon return to Australia. Internationally she has opened for country music legends Willie Nelson and Waylon Jennings. From 2005 to 2009, Urquhart was a presenter on Sydney Weekender, a travel show on Seven Network. She has been the host of country music show Saturday Night Country on Australian Broadcasting Corporation Local Radio across Australia since March 2010. She had previously filled-in for retiring host John Nutting who had picked her as his replacement.

In 2015, Urquhart formed the group Bennett Bowtell Urquhart with Kevin Bennett and Lyn Bowtell. In 2019, ten year since her last solo album, Urquhart released Frozen Rabbit. In January 2020, Urquhart and Josh Cunningham were invited to join Song Club—a creative collective that tasked members with writing a song a week. Nine of these weekly tracks were recorded and released in May 2021 on the album, The Song Club.

Personal life
In 2001, she met Glen Hannah who became her boyfriend. Urquhart and Hannah married on 10 March 2009 in Vanuatu.

She lives in Avoca Beach on the New South Wales Central Coast.

Discography

Studio albums

Charted singles

Awards and nominations

AIR Awards
The Australian Independent Record Awards (commonly known informally as AIR Awards) is an annual awards night to recognise, promote and celebrate the success of Australia's Independent Music sector.

|-
| 2008
| My Life
| AIR Best Independent Country Release
| 
|-
| 2020
| Frozen Rabbit
| AIR Best Independent Country Album 
| 
|-
| 2022
| The Song Club (with Josh Cunningham)
| Best Independent Country Album or EP
|

ARIA Music Awards

|-
|2009 || Landing Lights || ARIA Award for Best Country Album || 
|-
|2019 || Frozen Rabbit || Best Country Album || 
|-
|2021 || The Song Club (with Josh Cunningham) || Best Country Album || 
|-

Australian Club Entertainment Awards

|-
| 1998 || Felicity Urquhart || Country Female Performer || 
|-
| 1999 || Felicity Urquhart || Country Female Performer || 
|-
| 2000 || Felicity Urquhart || Country Female Performer || 
|-
| 2001 || Felicity Urquhart || Country Female Performer || 
|-
| 2002 || Felicity Urquhart || Country Female Performer || 
|-
| 2003 || Felicity Urquhart || Country Female Performer || 
|-
|2005 || Felicity Urquhart || Country Female Performer || 
|-
|2006 || Felicity Urquhart || Country Female Performer || 
|-
|2007 || Felicity Urquhart || Country Female Performer || 
|-
|2008 || Felicity Urquhart || Country Female Performer || 
|-
|2009 || Felicity Urquhart || Country Female Performer || 
|-

Australian Independent Country Music Awards

|-
| 2004 || Turn out the Light || Australian Independent Female Vocalist of the Year || 
|-
| rowspan="2"|2006  || My Life || Australian Independent Album of the Year || 
|-
| "The Flood" || Australian Independent Female Vocalist of the Year || 
|-

Australian Songwriters' Association

|-
|2005 || Felicity Urquhart & Glen Hannah – "The Flood" || Country Songwriter of the Year || 
|-

Country Music Awards (CMAA)
The Country Music Awards of Australia (CMAA) (also known as the Golden Guitar Awards) is an annual awards night held in January during the Tamworth Country Music Festival, celebrating recording excellence in the Australian country music industry. They have been held annually since 1973.

(wins only)
|-
| rowspan="2"| 2001 || Felicity Urquhart|| The Australian Country Music Hands of Fame || 
|-
| Felicity Urquhart (with Beccy Cole, Darren Coggan & Adam Harvey) – "Do I Ever Cross Your Mind" || Vocal Collaboration of the Year || 
|-
| 2006 || Felicity Urquhart || Independent Entertainer of the Year || 
|-
| rowspan="2"|2007 || "Big Black Cloud" || Video Clip of the Year || 
|-
| Felicity Urquhart || Independent Entertainer of the Year || 
|-
| 2010 || "Roller Coaster" || Female Vocalist of the Year || 
|-
| rowspan="5"| 2020|| Frozen Rabbit || Traditional Country Album of the Year || 
|-
| Frozen Rabbit || Female Artist of the Year|| 
|-
| Frozen Rabbit || Album of the Year|| 
|-
| "Chain of Joy" || Song of the Year|| 
|-
| "Chain of Joy"  || Single of the Year|| 
|-

Mo Award
The Australian Entertainment Mo Awards (commonly known informally as the Mo Awards), were annual Australian entertainment industry awards. They recognise achievements in live entertainment in Australia from 1975 to 2016. Urquhart won two awards in that time.

|-
| 1995 || Felicity Urquhart || Female Country Performer of the Year || 
|-
| 1997 || Felicity Urquhart || Female Country Performer of the Year || 
|-

References

External links
 Profile on ABC Local
 Felicity Urquhart at Tamworth rage page

1976 births
Living people
Australian country singers
Australian DJs
Australian radio personalities
People from Tamworth, New South Wales
21st-century Australian singers
EMI Classics and Virgin Classics artists
Australian television personalities
20th-century Australian women singers
Australian songwriters
Australian women radio presenters
Australian women television presenters